The Rickettsia rpsL leader is a putative attenuator element identified by bioinformatics within bacteria of the α-proteobacterial genus Rickettsia. It is located upstream of the operon encoding ribosomal proteins S12 and S7 (rpsL and rpsG genes respectively), and presents a Rho-independent terminator at the 3' end. This RNA is presumed to operate as a non-coding ribosomal protein leader potentially interacting with the S12 or S7 proteins, encoded by the operon. The motif might be related to other rpsL leaders, such as that from Pseudomonas.

References

External links 

Cis-regulatory RNA elements